The Kuomintang (KMT), also referred to as the Guomindang (GMD), the Nationalist Party of China (NPC) or the Chinese Nationalist Party (CNP), is a major political party in the Republic of China, initially on the Chinese mainland and then in Taiwan since 1949. It was the sole party in China during the Republican Era from 1928 to 1949, when most of the Chinese mainland was under its control. The party retreated from the mainland to Taiwan on 7 December 1949, following its defeat in the Chinese Civil War. Chiang Kai-shek declared martial law and retained its authoritarian rule over Taiwan under the Dang Guo system until democratic reforms were enacted in the 1980s and full democratization in the 1990s. In Taiwanese politics today, the KMT is a centre-right to right-wing party, and is the largest party in the Pan-Blue Coalition. The KMT's primary rival in elections is the Democratic Progressive Party (DPP) and its allies in the Pan-Green Coalition. As of 2023, the KMT is currently the largest opposition party in the Legislative Yuan. The current chairman is Eric Chu.

The party originated as the Revive China Society, founded by Sun Yat-sen on 24 November 1894 in Honolulu, Republic of Hawaii. From there, the party underwent major reorganization changes that occurred before and after the Xinhai Revolution, which resulted in the collapse of the Qing dynasty  and the establishment of the Beiyang government. In 1919, Sun Yat-sen re-established the party under the name "Kuomintang" in the Shanghai French Concession. From 1926 to 1928, the KMT under Chiang Kai-shek successfully led the Northern Expedition against regional warlords and unified the fragmented nation. From 1937 to 1945, the KMT-ruled Nationalist government led China through the Second Sino-Japanese War against Japan. By 1949, the KMT was decisively defeated by the Chinese Communist Party (CCP) in the Chinese Civil War (in which the People's Republic of China was established by the CCP on 1 October 1949) and withdrew the ROC government to Taiwan, a former Qing territory annexed by the Empire of Japan from 1895 to 1945.
	
From 1949 to 1987, the KMT ruled Taiwan as an authoritarian one-party state after the February 28 incident. During this period, martial law was in effect and civil liberties were curtailed under the guise of anti-communism, with the period being known as the White Terror. The party also oversaw Taiwan's economic development, but also experienced diplomatic setbacks, including the ROC losing its United Nations seat and most of the world including its ally the United States switching diplomatic recognition to the CCP-led People's Republic of China (PRC) in the 1970s. In the late 1980s, Chiang Ching-kuo, Chiang Kai-shek's son and the next KMT leader in turn, lifted martial law and allowed the establishment of opposition parties such as the Democratic Progressive Party. His successor Lee Teng-hui continued pursuing democratic reforms and constitutional amendments, and was re-elected in 1996 through a direct presidential election, the first time in the ROC history. The 2000 presidential election put an end to 72 years of the KMT's political dominance in the ROC. The KMT reclaimed power from 2008 to 2016, with the landslide victory of Ma Ying-jeou in the 2008 presidential election, whose presidency significantly loosened restrictions placed on cross-strait economic and cultural exchanges. The KMT again lost the presidency and its legislative majority in the 2016 election, returning to the opposition.

The KMT is a member of the International Democrat Union. The party's guiding ideology is the Three Principles of the People, advocated by Sun Yat-sen and historically organized in a Leninist basis of democratic centralism, a principle conceived by the Russian revolutionary Vladimir Lenin that entailed open discussion of policy on the condition of unity among party members in upholding the agreed-upon decisions. The KMT opposes de jure Taiwan independence, Chinese unification under the "one country, two systems" framework, and any non-peaceful means to resolve the cross-strait disputes. Originally placing high priority on reclaiming the Chinese mainland through Project National Glory, the KMT now favors a closer relation with the PRC and seeks to maintain Taiwan's status quo under the Constitution of the Republic of China. The party also accepts the 1992 Consensus, which defines both sides of the Taiwan Strait as "one China" but maintains its ambiguity to different interpretations.

History

Founding and Sun Yat-sen era 

The KMT traces its ideological and organizational roots to the work of Sun Yat-sen, a proponent of Chinese nationalism and democracy who founded the Revive China Society at the capital of the Republic of Hawaii, Honolulu, on 24 November 1894. In 1905, Sun joined forces with other anti-monarchist societies in Tokyo, Empire of Japan, to form the Tongmenghui, a group committed to the overthrow of the Qing dynasty and the establishment of a republic, on 20 August 1905.

The group supported the Xinhai Revolution of 1911 and the founding of the Republic of China on 1 January 1912. Although Sun and the Tongmenghui are often depicted as the principal organizers of the Xinhai Revolution, this view is disputed by scholars who argue that the Revolution broke out in a leaderless and decentralized way and that Sun was only later elected provisional president of the new Chinese republic. However, Sun did not have military power and ceded the provisional presidency of the republic to Yuan Shikai, who arranged for the abdication of Puyi, the last Emperor, on 12 February.

On 25 August 1912, the Nationalist Party was established at the Huguang Guild Hall in Peking, where the Tongmenghui and five smaller pro-revolution parties merged to contest the first national elections. Sun was chosen as the party chairman with Huang Xing as his deputy.

The most influential member of the party was the third ranking Song Jiaoren, who mobilized mass support from gentry and merchants for the Nationalists to advocate a constitutional parliamentary democracy. The party opposed constitutional monarchists and sought to check the power of Yuan. The Nationalists won an overwhelming majority in the first National Assembly election in December 1912.

However, Yuan soon began to ignore the parliament in making presidential decisions. Song Jiaoren was assassinated in Shanghai in 1913. Members of the Nationalists, led by Sun Yat-sen, suspected that Yuan was behind the plot and thus staged the Second Revolution in July 1913, a poorly planned and ill-supported armed rising to overthrow Yuan, and failed. Yuan, claiming subversiveness and betrayal, expelled adherents of the KMT from the parliament. Yuan dissolved the Nationalists, whose members had largely fled into exile in Japan, in November and dismissed the parliament early in 1914.

Yuan Shikai proclaimed himself emperor in December 1915. While exiled in Japan in 1914, Sun established the Chinese Revolutionary Party on 8 July 1914, but many of his old revolutionary comrades, including Huang Xing, Wang Jingwei, Hu Hanmin and Chen Jiongming, refused to join him or support his efforts in inciting armed uprising against Yuan. To join the Revolutionary Party, members had to take an oath of personal loyalty to Sun, which many old revolutionaries regarded as undemocratic and contrary to the spirit of the revolution. As a result, he became largely sidelined within the Republican movement during this period.

Sun returned to China in 1917 to establish a military junta at Canton to oppose the Beiyang government but was soon forced out of office and exiled to Shanghai. There, with renewed support, he resurrected the KMT on 10 October 1919, under the name Kuomintang of China and established its headquarters in Canton in 1920.

In 1923, the KMT and its Canton government accepted aid from the Soviet Union after being denied recognition by the western powers. Soviet advisers—the most prominent of whom was Mikhail Borodin, an agent of the Comintern—arrived in China in 1923 to aid in the reorganization and consolidation of the KMT along the lines of the Russian Communist Party (Bolsheviks), establishing a Leninist party structure that lasted into the 1990s. The Chinese Communist Party (CCP) was under Comintern instructions to cooperate with the KMT, and its members were encouraged to join while maintaining their separate party identities, forming the First United Front between the two parties. Mao Zedong and early members of the CCP also joined the KMT in 1923.

Soviet advisers also helped the KMT to set up a political institute to train propagandists in mass mobilization techniques, and in 1923 Chiang Kai-shek, one of Sun's lieutenants from the Tongmenghui days, was sent to Moscow for several months' military and political study. At the first party congress in 1924 in Kwangchow, Kwangtung, (Guangzhou, Guangdong) which included non-KMT delegates such as members of the CCP, they adopted Sun's political theory, which included the Three Principles of the People: nationalism, democracy and people's livelihood.

Under Chiang Kai-shek in Mainland China  

When Sun Yat-sen died in 1925, the political leadership of the KMT fell to Wang Jingwei and Hu Hanmin, respectively the left-wing and right-wing leaders of the party. However, the real power was in the hands of Chiang Kai-shek, who was in near complete control of the military as the superintendent of the Whampoa Military Academy. With their military superiority, the KMT confirmed their rule on Canton, the provincial capital of Kwangtung. The Guangxi warlords pledged loyalty to the KMT. The KMT now became a rival government in opposition to the warlord Beiyang government based in Peking.

Chiang assumed leadership of the KMT on 6 July 1926. Unlike Sun Yat-sen, whom he admired greatly and who forged all his political, economic, and revolutionary ideas primarily from what he had learned in Hawaii and indirectly through Hong Kong and Japan under the Meiji Restoration, Chiang knew relatively little about the West. He also studied in Japan, but he was firmly rooted in his ancient Han Chinese identity and was steeped in Chinese culture. As his life progressed, he became increasingly attached to ancient Chinese culture and traditions. His few trips to the West confirmed his pro-ancient Chinese outlook and he studied the ancient Chinese classics and ancient Chinese history assiduously. In 1923, after the formation of the First United Front, Sun Yat-sen sent Chiang to spend three months in Moscow studying the political and military system of the Soviet Union. Although Chiang did not follow the Soviet Communist doctrine, he, like the Communist Party, sought to destroy warlordism and foreign imperialism in China, and upon his return established the Whampoa Military Academy near Guangzhou, following the Soviet Model.

Chiang was also particularly committed to Sun's idea of "political tutelage". Sun believed that the only hope for a unified and better China lay in a military conquest, followed by a period of political tutelage that would culminate in the transition to democracy. Using this ideology, Chiang built himself into the dictator of the Republic of China, both in the Chinese mainland and after the national government relocated to Taiwan.

Following the death of Sun Yat-sen, Chiang Kai-shek emerged as the KMT leader and launched the Northern Expedition to defeat the northern warlords and unite China under the party. With its power confirmed in the southeast, the Nationalist Government appointed Chiang Kai-shek commander-in-chief of the National Revolutionary Army (NRA), and the Northern Expedition to suppress the warlords began. Chiang had to defeat three separate warlords and two independent armies. Chiang, with Soviet supplies, conquered the southern half of China in nine months.

A split erupted between the Chinese Communist Party and the KMT, which threatened the Northern Expedition. Wang Jing Wei, who led the KMT leftist allies, took the city of Wuhan in January 1927. With the support of the Soviet agent Mikhail Borodin, Wang declared the National Government as having moved to Wuhan. Having taken Nanking in March, Chiang halted his campaign and prepared a violent break with Wang and his communist allies. Chiang's expulsion of the CCP and their Soviet advisers, marked by the Shanghai massacre on 12 April, led to the beginning of the Chinese Civil War. Wang finally surrendered his power to Chiang. Joseph Stalin ordered the Chinese Communist Party to obey the KMT leadership. Once this split had been healed, Chiang resumed his Northern Expedition and managed to take Shanghai.

During the Nanking Incident in March 1927, the NRA stormed the consulates of the United States, the United Kingdom and Imperial Japan, looted foreign properties and almost assassinated the Japanese consul. An American, two British, one French, an Italian and a Japanese were killed. These looters also stormed and seized millions of dollars worth of British concessions in Hankou, refusing to hand them back to the UK government. Both Nationalists and Communist soldiers within the army participated in the rioting and looting of foreign residents in Nanking.

NRA took Peking in 1928. The city was the internationally recognized capital, even when it was previously controlled by warlords. This event allowed the KMT to receive widespread diplomatic recognition in the same year. The capital was moved from Peking to Nanking, the original capital of the Ming dynasty, and thus a symbolic purge of the final Qing elements. This period of KMT rule in China between 1927 and 1937 was relatively stable and prosperous and is still known as the Nanjing decade.

After the Northern Expedition in 1928, the Nationalist government under the KMT declared that China had been exploited for decades under the unequal treaties signed between the foreign powers and the Qing dynasty. The KMT government demanded that the foreign powers renegotiate the treaties on equal terms.

Before the Northern Expedition, the KMT began as a heterogeneous group advocating American-inspired federalism and provincial autonomy. However, the KMT under Chiang's leadership aimed at establishing a centralized one-party state with one ideology. This was even more evident following Sun's elevation into a cult figure after his death. The control by one single party began the period of "political tutelage", whereby the party was to lead the government while instructing the people on how to participate in a democratic system. The topic of reorganizing the army, brought up at a military conference in 1929, sparked the Central Plains War. The cliques, some of them former warlords, demanded to retain their army and political power within their own territories. Although Chiang finally won the war, the conflicts among the cliques would have a devastating effect on the survival of the KMT. Muslim Generals in Kansu waged war against the Guominjun in favor of the KMT during the conflict in Gansu in 1927–1930.

In 1931, Japanese aggression resumed with the Mukden Incident and occupation of Manchuria, and the CCP founded the Chinese Soviet Republic (CSR) in Jiangxi while secretly recruiting within the KMT government and military. Chiang was alarmed by the expansion of communist influence; he wanted to suppress internal conflicts before confronting foreign aggression. The KMT were aided by German military advisors. The CSR was destroyed in 1934 after a series of KMT offensives. The communists abandoned bases in southeast China for Shaanxi in a military retreat called the Long March; less than 10% of the communist army survived. A new base, the Shaan-Gan-Ning Border Region, was created with Soviet aid.

KMT secret police persecuted suspected communists and political opponents with terror. In The Birth of Communist China, C.P. Fitzgerald describes China under the rule of the KMT thus: "the Chinese people groaned under a regime Fascist in every quality except efficiency."

In 1936, Chiang was kidnapped by Zhang Xueliang in the Xi'an Incident and forced into the Second United Front, an anti-Japanese alliance with the CCP; the Second Sino-Japanese War started the following year. The alliance brought little coordination and was treated as a temporary cease fire in the civil war. The New Fourth Army Incident in 1941 ended the alliance.

While the KMT army sustained heavy casualties fighting the Japanese, the CCP expanded its territory by guerrilla tactics within Japanese occupied regions, leading some claims that the CCP often refused to support the KMT troops, choosing to withdraw and let the KMT troops take the brunt of Japanese attacks.

Japan surrendered in 1945, and Taiwan was returned to the Republic of China on 25 October of that year. The brief period of celebration was soon shadowed by the possibility of a civil war between the KMT and CCP. The Soviet Union declared war on Japan just before it surrendered and occupied Manchuria, the north eastern part of China. The Soviet Union denied the KMT army the right to enter the region but allowed the CCP to take control of the Japanese factories and their supplies.

Full-scale civil war between the Communists and the Nationalists erupted in 1946. The Communist Chinese armies, the People's Liberation Army (PLA), previously a minor faction, grew rapidly in influence and power due to several errors on the KMT's part. First, the KMT reduced troop levels precipitously after the Japanese surrender, leaving large numbers of able-bodied, trained fighting men who became unemployed and disgruntled with the KMT as prime recruits for the PLA. Second, the KMT government proved thoroughly unable to manage the economy, allowing hyperinflation to result. Among the most despised and ineffective efforts it undertook to contain inflation was the conversion to the gold standard for the national treasury and the Chinese gold yuan in August 1948, outlawing private ownership of gold, silver and foreign exchange, collecting all such precious metals and foreign exchange from the people and issuing the Gold Standard Scrip in exchange. As most farmland in the north were under CCP's control, the cities governed by the KMT lacked food supply and this added to the hyperinflation. The new scrip became worthless in only ten months and greatly reinforced the nationwide perception of the KMT as a corrupt or at best inept entity. Third, Chiang Kai-shek ordered his forces to defend the urbanized cities. This decision gave CCP a chance to move freely through the countryside. At first, the KMT had the edge with the aid of weapons and ammunition from the United States (US). However, with the country suffering from hyperinflation, widespread corruption and other economic ills, the KMT continued to lose popular support. Some leading officials and military leaders of the KMT hoarded material, armament and military-aid funding provided by the US. This became an issue which proved to be a hindrance of its relationship with US government. US President Harry S. Truman wrote that "the Chiangs, the Kungs and the Soongs (were) all thieves", having taken $750 million in US aid.

At the same time, the suspension of American aid and tens of thousands of deserted or decommissioned soldiers being recruited to the PLA cause tipped the balance of power quickly to the CCP side, and the overwhelming popular support for the CCP in most of the country made it all but impossible for the KMT forces to carry out successful assaults against the Communists.

By the end of 1949, the CCP controlled almost all of mainland China, as the KMT retreated to Taiwan with a significant amount of China's national treasures and 2 million people, including military forces and refugees. Some party members stayed in the mainland and broke away from the main KMT to found the Revolutionary Committee of the Kuomintang (also known as the Left Kuomintang), which still currently exists as one of the eight minor registered parties of the People's Republic of China.

Rule over Taiwan: 1945–present 

In 1895, Formosa (now called Taiwan), including the Penghu islands, became a Japanese colony via the Treaty of Shimonoseki following the First Sino-Japanese War.

After Japan's defeat at the end of World War II in 1945, General Order No. 1 instructed Japan to surrender its troops in Taiwan to Chiang Kai-shek. On 25 October 1945, KMT general Chen Yi acted on behalf of the Allied Powers to accept Japan's surrender and proclaimed that day as Taiwan Retrocession Day.

Tensions between the local Taiwanese and mainlanders from Mainland China increased in the intervening years, culminating in a flashpoint on 27 February 1947 in Taipei when a dispute between a female cigarette vendor and an anti-smuggling officer in front of Tianma Tea House triggered civil disorder and protests that would last for days. The uprising turned bloody and was shortly put down by the ROC Army in the February 28 Incident. As a result of the 28 February Incident in 1947, Taiwanese people endured what is called the "White Terror", a KMT-led political repression that resulted in the death or disappearance of over 30,000 Taiwanese intellectuals, activists, and people suspected of opposition to the KMT.

Following the establishment of the People's Republic of China (PRC) on 1 October 1949, the commanders of the People's Liberation Army (PLA) believed that Kinmen and Matsu had to be taken before a final assault on Taiwan. The KMT fought the Battle of Guningtou on 25–27 October 1949 and stopped the PLA invasion. The KMT headquarters was set up on 10 December 1949 at No. 11 Zhongshan South Road. In 1950, Chiang took office in Taipei under the Temporary Provisions Effective During the Period of Communist Rebellion. The provision declared martial law in Taiwan and halted some democratic processes, including presidential and parliamentary elections, until the mainland could be recovered from the CCP. The KMT estimated it would take 3 years to defeat the Communists. The slogan was "prepare in the first year, start fighting in the second, and conquer in the third year." Chiang also initiated the Project National Glory to retake back the mainland in 1965, but was eventually dropped in July 1972 after many unsuccessful attempts.

However, various factors, including international pressure, are believed to have prevented the KMT from militarily engaging the CCP full-scale. The KMT backed Muslim insurgents formerly belonging to the National Revolutionary Army during the KMT Islamic insurgency in 1950–1958 in Mainland China. A cold war with a couple of minor military conflicts was resulted in the early years. The various government bodies previously in Nanjing, that were re-established in Taipei as the KMT-controlled government, actively claimed sovereignty over all China. The Republic of China in Taiwan retained China's seat in the United Nations until 1971 as well as recognition by the United States until 1979.

Until the 1970s, the KMT successfully pushed ahead with land reforms, developed the economy, implemented a democratic system in a lower level of the government, improved relations between Taiwan and the mainland and created the Taiwan economic miracle. However, the KMT controlled the government under a one-party authoritarian state until reforms in the late 1970s through the 1990s. The ROC in Taiwan was once referred to synonymously with the KMT and known simply as Nationalist China after its ruling party. In the 1970s, the KMT began to allow for "supplemental elections" in Taiwan to fill the seats of the aging representatives in the National Assembly.

Although opposition parties were not permitted, the pro-democracy movement Tangwai ("outside the KMT") created the Democratic Progressive Party (DPP) on 28 September 1986. Outside observers of Taiwanese politics expected the KMT to clamp down and crush the illegal opposition party, though this did not occur, and instead the party's formation marked the beginning of Taiwan's democratization.

In 1991, martial law ceased when President Lee Teng-hui terminated the Temporary Provisions Effective During the Period of Communist Rebellion. All parties started to be allowed to compete at all levels of elections, including the presidential election. Lee Teng-hui, the ROC's first democratically elected president and the leader of the KMT during the 1990s, announced his advocacy of "special state-to-state relations" with the PRC. The PRC associated this idea with Taiwan independence.

The KMT faced a split in 1993 that led to the formation of the New Party in August 1993, alleged to be a result of Lee's "corruptive ruling style". The New Party has, since the purging of Lee, largely reintegrated into the KMT. A much more serious split in the party occurred as a result of the 2000 presidential election. Upset at the choice of Lien Chan as the party's presidential nominee, former party Secretary-General James Soong launched an independent bid, which resulted in the expulsion of Soong and his supporters and the formation of the People First Party (PFP) on 31 March 2000. The KMT candidate placed third behind Soong in the elections. After the election, Lee's strong relationship with the opponent became apparent. To prevent defections to the PFP, Lien moved the party away from Lee's pro-independence policies and became more favorable toward Chinese unification. This shift led to Lee's expulsion from the party and the formation of the Taiwan Solidarity Union (TSU) by Lee supporters on 24 July 2001.

Prior to this, the party's voters had defected to both the PFP and TSU, and the KMT did poorly in the December 2001 legislative elections and lost its position as the largest party in the Legislative Yuan. However, the party did well in the 2002 local government mayoral and council election with Ma Ying-jeou, its candidate for Taipei mayor, winning reelection by a landslide and its candidate for Kaohsiung mayor narrowly losing but doing surprisingly well. Since 2002, the KMT and PFP have coordinated electoral strategies. In 2004, the KMT and PFP ran a joint presidential ticket, with Lien running for president and Soong running for vice-president.

The loss of the presidential election of 2004 to DPP President Chen Shui-bian by merely over 30,000 votes was a bitter disappointment to party members, leading to large scale rallies for several weeks protesting alleged electoral fraud and the "odd circumstances" of the shooting of President Chen. However, the fortunes of the party were greatly improved when the KMT did well in the legislative elections held in December 2004 by maintaining its support in southern Taiwan achieving a majority for the Pan-Blue Coalition.

Soon after the election, there appeared to be a falling out with the KMT's junior partner, the People First Party and talk of a merger seemed to have ended. This split appeared to widen in early 2005, as the leader of the PFP, James Soong appeared to be reconciling with President Chen Shui-Bian and the Democratic Progressive Party. Many PFP members including legislators and municipal leaders have since defected to the KMT, and the PFP is seen as a fading party.

In 2005, Ma Ying-jeou became KMT chairman defeating speaker Wang Jin-pyng in the first public election for KMT chairmanship. The KMT won a decisive victory in the 3-in-1 local elections of December 2005, replacing the DPP as the largest party at the local level. This was seen as a major victory for the party ahead of legislative elections in 2007. There were elections for the two municipalities of the ROC, Taipei and Kaohsiung in December 2006. The KMT won a clear victory in Taipei, but lost to the DPP in the southern city of Kaohsiung by the slim margin of 1,100 votes.

On 13 February 2007, Ma was indicted by the Taiwan High Prosecutors Office on charges of allegedly embezzling approximately NT$11 million (US$339,000), regarding the issue of "special expenses" while he was mayor of Taipei. Shortly after the indictment, he submitted his resignation as KMT chairman at the same press conference at which he formally announced his candidacy for ROC president. Ma argued that it was customary for officials to use the special expense fund for personal expenses undertaken in the course of their official duties. In December 2007, Ma was acquitted of all charges and immediately filed suit against the prosecutors. In 2008, the KMT won a landslide victory in the Republic of China presidential election on 22 March 2008. The KMT fielded former Taipei mayor and former KMT chairman Ma Ying-jeou to run against the DPP's Frank Hsieh. Ma won by a margin of 17% against Hsieh. Ma took office on 20 May 2008, with vice-presidential candidate Vincent Siew, and ended 8 years of the DPP presidency. The KMT also won a landslide victory in the 2008 legislative elections, winning 81 of 113 seats, or 71.7% of seats in the Legislative Yuan. These two elections gave the KMT firm control of both the executive and legislative yuans.

On 25 June 2009, President Ma launched his bid to regain the KMT leadership and registered as the sole candidate for the chairmanship election. On 26 July, Ma won 93.87% of the vote, becoming the new chairman of the KMT, taking office on 17 October 2009. This officially allowed Ma to be able to meet with Xi Jinping, the General Secretary of the Chinese Communist Party, and other PRC delegates, as he was able to represent the KMT as leader of a Chinese political party rather than as head-of-state of a political entity unrecognized by the PRC.

On 29 November 2014, the KMT suffered a heavy loss in the local election to the DPP, winning only 6 municipalities and counties, down from 14 in the previous election in 2009 and 2010. Ma Ying-jeou subsequently resigned from the party chairmanship on 3 December and replaced by acting Chairman Wu Den-yih. Chairmanship election was held on 17 January 2015 and Eric Chu was elected to become the new chairman. He was inaugurated on 19 February.

Current issues and challenges

Party assets 
Upon arriving in Taiwan the KMT occupied assets previously owned by the Japanese and forced local businesses to make contributions directly to the KMT. Some of this real estate and other assets was distributed to party loyalists, but most of it remained with the party, as did the profits generated by the properties.

As the ruling party on Taiwan, the KMT amassed a vast business empire of banks, investment companies, petrochemical firms, and television and radio stations, thought to have made it the world's richest political party, with assets once estimated to be around US$2–10 billion. Although this war chest appeared to help the KMT until the mid-1990s, it later led to accusations of corruption (often referred to as "black gold").

After 2000, the KMT's financial holdings appeared to be more of a liability than a benefit, and the KMT started to divest itself of its assets. However, the transactions were not disclosed and the whereabouts of the money earned from selling assets (if it has gone anywhere) is unknown. There were accusations in the 2004 presidential election that the KMT retained assets that were illegally acquired. During the 2000–2008 DPP presidency, a law was proposed by the DPP in the Legislative Yuan to recover illegally acquired party assets and return them to the government. However, due to the DPP's lack of control of the legislative chamber at the time, it never materialized.

The KMT also acknowledged that part of its assets were acquired through extra-legal means and thus promised to "retro-endow" them to the government. However, the quantity of the assets which should be classified as illegal are still under heated debate. DPP, in its capacity as ruling party from 2000 to 2008, claimed that there is much more that the KMT has yet to acknowledge. Also, the KMT actively sold assets under its title to quench its recent financial difficulties, which the DPP argues is illegal. Former KMT chairman Ma Ying-Jeou's position is that the KMT will sell some of its properties at below market rates rather than return them to the government and that the details of these transactions will not be publicly disclosed.

In 2006, the KMT sold its headquarters at 11 Zhongshan South Road in Taipei to Evergreen Group for NT$2.3 billion (US$96 million). The KMT moved into a smaller building on Bade Road in the eastern part of the city.

In July 2014, the KMT reported total assets of NT$26.8 billion (US$892.4 million) and interest earnings of NT$981.52 million for the year of 2013, making it one of the richest political parties in the world.

In August 2016, the Ill-gotten Party Assets Settlement Committee was set up by the ruling DPP government to investigate KMT party assets acquired during the martial law period and recover those that were determined to be illegally acquired.

Cross-strait relations 
In December 2003, then-KMT chairman (present chairman emeritus) and presidential candidate Lien Chan initiated what appeared to some to be a major shift in the party's position on the linked questions of Chinese unification and Taiwan independence. Speaking to foreign journalists, Lien said that while the KMT was opposed to "immediate independence", it did not wish to be classed as "pro-reunificationist" either.

At the same time, Wang Jin-pyng, speaker of the Legislative Yuan and the Pan-Blue Coalition's campaign manager in the 2004 presidential election, said that the party no longer opposed Taiwan's "eventual independence". This statement was later clarified as meaning that the KMT opposes any immediate decision on unification and independence and would like to have this issue resolved by future generations. The KMT's position on the cross-strait relations was redefined as hoping to remain in the current neither-independent-nor-united situation.

However, there had been a warming of relations between the Pan-Blue Coalition and the PRC, with prominent members of both the KMT and PFP in active discussions with officials on the mainland. In February 2004, it appeared that the KMT had opened a campaign office for the Lien-Soong ticket in Shanghai targeting Taiwanese businessmen. However, after an adverse reaction in Taiwan, the KMT quickly declared that the office was opened without official knowledge or authorization. In addition, the PRC issued a statement forbidding open campaigning in the mainland and formally stated that it had no preference as to which candidate won and cared only about the positions of the winning candidate.

In 2005, then-party chairman Lien Chan announced that he was to leave his office. The two leading contenders for the position included Ma Ying-jeou and Wang Jin-pyng. On 5 April 2005, Taipei Mayor Ma Ying-jeou said he wished to lead the opposition KMT with Wang Jin-pyng. On 16 July 2005, Ma was elected KMT chairman in the first contested leadership in the KMT's 93-year history. Some 54% of the party's 1.04 million members cast their ballots. Ma garnered 72.4% of the vote share, or 375,056 votes, against Wang's 27.6%, or 143,268 votes. After failing to convince Wang to stay on as a vice chairman, Ma named holdovers Wu Po-hsiung, Chiang Pin-kung and Lin Cheng-chi, as well as long-time party administrator and strategist John Kuan as vice-chairmen. All appointments were approved by a hand count of party delegates.

On 28 March 2005, thirty members of the KMT, led by vice-chairman Chiang Pin-kung, arrived in mainland China. This marked the first official visit by the KMT to the mainland since it was defeated by communist forces in 1949 (although KMT members including Chiang had made individual visits in the past). The delegates began their itinerary by paying homage to the revolutionary martyrs of the Tenth Uprising at Huanghuagang. They subsequently flew to the former ROC capital of Nanjing to commemorate Sun Yat-sen.  During the trip, the KMT signed a 10-point agreement with the CCP. The proponents regarded this visit as the prelude of the third KMT-CCP cooperation, after the First and Second United Front. Weeks afterwards, in May 2005, Chairman Lien Chan visited the mainland and met with Hu Jintao, General Secretary of the Chinese Communist Party. This marked the first meeting between leaders of the KMT and CCP after the end of Chinese Civil War in 1949. No agreements were signed because incumbent Chen Shui-bian's government threatened to prosecute the KMT delegation for treason and violation of ROC laws prohibiting citizens from collaborating with CCP.

Supporter base 
Support for the KMT in Taiwan encompasses a wide range of social groups but is largely determined by age. KMT support tends to be higher in northern Taiwan and in urban areas, where it draws its backing from big businesses due to its policy of maintaining commercial links with mainland China. As of 2020 only 3% of KMT members are under 40 years of age.

The KMT also has some support in the labor sector because of the many labor benefits and insurance implemented while the KMT was in power. The KMT traditionally has strong cooperation with military officers, teachers, and government workers. Among the ethnic groups in Taiwan, the KMT has stronger support among mainlanders and their descendants, for ideological reasons, and among Taiwanese aboriginals. The support for the KMT generally tend to be stronger in majority-Hakka and Mandarin-speaking counties of Taiwan, in contrast to the Hokkien-majority southwestern counties that tend to support the Democratic Progressive Party.

The deep-rooted hostility between Aboriginals and (Taiwanese) Hoklo, and the Aboriginal communities effective KMT networks, contribute to Aboriginal skepticism towards the Democratic Progressive Party (DPP) and the Aboriginals' tendency to vote for the KMT. Aboriginals have criticized politicians for abusing the "indigenization" movement for political gains, such as aboriginal opposition to the DPP's "rectification" by recognizing the Taroko for political reasons, with the majority of mountain townships voting for Ma Ying-jeou. In 2005 the Kuomintang displayed a massive photo of the anti-Japanese Aboriginal leader Mona Rudao at its headquarters in honor of the 60th anniversary of Taiwan's retrocession from Japan to the Republic of China.

On social issues, the KMT does not take an official position on same-sex marriage, though most members of legislative committees, mayors of cities, and the most recent presidential candidate (Han Kuo-yu) oppose it. The party does, however, have a small faction that supports same-sex marriage, consisting mainly of young people and people in the Taipei metropolitan area. The opposition to same-sex marriage comes mostly from Christian groups, who wield significant political influence within the KMT.

Organization

Leadership 
The Kuomintang's constitution designated Sun Yat-sen as party president. After his death, the Kuomintang opted to keep that language in its constitution to honor his memory forever. The party has since been headed by a director-general (1927–1975) and a chairman (since 1975), positions which officially discharge the functions of the president.

Current Central Committee Leadership

Legislative Yuan leader (Caucus leader) 

  (1 February 1999 – 1 February 2004)
 Tseng Yung-chuan (1 February 2004 – 1 December 2008)
 Lin Yi-shih (1 December 2008 – 1 February 2012)
 Lin Hung-chih (1 February 2012 – 31 July 2014)
  (31 July 2014 – 7 February 2015)
 Lai Shyh-bao (7 February 2015 – 7 July 2016)
 Liao Kuo-tung (7 July 2016 – 29 June 2017)
 Lin Te-fu (29 June 2017 – 14 June 2018)
 Johnny Chiang (14 June 2018 – 2019)
 Tseng Ming-chung (2019 – 2020)
  (2020 – 2021)
 Alex Fai (2021 – 2022)
 Tseng Ming-chung (2022 – present)

Party organization and structure 
The KMT is being led by a Central Committee with a commitment to a Leninist principle of democratic centralism:
 National Congress
 Party chairman
 Vice-chairmen
 
 Central Steering Committee for Women
 Central Standing Committee
 Secretary-General
 Deputy Secretaries-General
 Executive Director

Standing committees and departments

 Policy Committee
 Policy Coordination Department
 Policy Research Department
 Mainland Affairs Department
 Institute of Revolutionary Practice, formerly National Development Institute
 Kuomintang Youth League
 Research Division
 Education and Counselling Division
Party Disciplinary Committee
 Evaluation and Control Office
 Audit Office
 Culture and Communications Committee
 Cultural Department
 Communications Department
 KMT Party History Institute
 Administration Committee
 Personnel Office
 General Office
 Finance Office
 Accounting Office
 Information Center
 Organizational Development Committee
 Organization and Operations Department
 Elections Mobilization Department
 Community Volunteers Department
 Overseas Department
 Youth Department
 Women's Department

Party charter 

The Kuomintang Party Charter was adopted on January 28, 1924. The current charter has 51 articles and includes contents of General Principles, Party Membership, Organization,  The National President, The Director-General, The National Congress, The Central Committee, District and Sub-District Party Headquarters, Cadres and Tenure, Discipline, Awards and Punishment, Funding, and Supplementary Provisions. The most recent version was made at the Twentieth National Congress on July 28, 2019.

Ideology in mainland China

Chinese nationalism 
The KMT was a nationalist revolutionary party that had been supported by the Soviet Union. It was organized on the Leninist principle of democratic centralism.

The KMT had several influences upon its ideology by revolutionary thinking. The KMT and Chiang Kai-shek used the words feudal and counterrevolutionary as synonyms for evil and backwardness, and they proudly proclaimed themselves to be revolutionaries. Chiang called the warlords feudalists, and he also called for feudalism and counterrevolutionaries to be stamped out by the KMT. Chiang showed extreme rage when he was called a warlord, because of the word's negative and feudal connotations. Ma Bufang was forced to defend himself against the accusations, and stated to the news media that his army was a part of "National army, people's power".

Chiang Kai-shek, the head of the KMT, warned the Soviet Union and other foreign countries about interfering in Chinese affairs. He was personally angry at the way China was treated by foreigners, mainly by the Soviet Union, Britain, and the United States. He and his New Life Movement called for the crushing of Soviet, Western, American and other foreign influences in China. Chen Lifu, a CC Clique member in the KMT, said "Communism originated from Soviet imperialism, which has encroached on our country." It was also noted that "the white bear of the North Pole is known for its viciousness and cruelty".

KMT leaders across China adopted nationalist rhetoric. The Chinese Muslim general Ma Bufang of Qinghai presented himself as a Chinese nationalist to the people of China who was fighting against Western imperialism to deflect criticism by opponents that his government was feudal and oppressed minorities like Tibetans and Buddhist Mongols. He used his Chinese nationalist credentials to his advantage to keep himself in power.

Fascism 
The Blue Shirts Society, a fascist paramilitary organization within the KMT that modeled itself after Mussolini's blackshirts, was anti-foreign and anti-communist, and it stated that its agenda was to expel foreign (Japanese and Western) imperialists from China, crush Communism, and eliminate feudalism. In addition to being anticommunist, some KMT members, like Chiang Kai-shek's right-hand man Dai Li were anti-American, and wanted to expel American influence. Close Sino-German ties also promoted cooperation between the Kuomintang and the Nazi Party (NSDAP).

The New Life Movement was a government-led civic movement in 1930s China initiated by Chiang Kai-shek to promote cultural reform and Neo-Confucian social morality and to ultimately unite China under a centralised ideology following the emergence of ideological challenges to the status quo. The Movement attempted to counter threats of Western and Japanese imperialism through a resurrection of traditional Chinese morality, which it held to be superior to modern Western values. As such the Movement was based upon Confucianism, mixed with Christianity, nationalism and authoritarianism that have some similarities to fascism. It rejected individualism and liberalism, while also opposing socialism and communism. Some historians regard this movement as imitating Nazism and being a neo-nationalistic movement used to elevate Chiang's control of everyday lives. Frederic Wakeman suggested that the New Life Movement was "Confucian fascism".

Ideology of the New Guangxi Clique 
The KMT branch in Guangxi province, led by the New Guangxi Clique of Bai Chongxi and Li Zongren, implemented anti-imperialist, anti-religious, and anti-foreign policies. During the Northern Expedition, in 1926 in Guangxi, Muslim General Bai Chongxi led his troops in destroying most of the Buddhist temples and smashing idols, turning the temples into schools and KMT headquarters. Bai led an anti-foreign wave in Guangxi, attacking American, European, and other foreigners and missionaries, and generally making the province unsafe for non-natives. Westerners fled from the province, and some Chinese Christians were also attacked as imperialist agents.

The leaders clashed with Chiang Kai-shek, which led to the Central Plains War where Chiang defeated the clique.

Socialism and anti-capitalist agitation 

The KMT had a left wing and a right wing, the left being more radical in its pro-Soviet policies, but both wings equally persecuted merchants, accusing them of being counterrevolutionaries and reactionaries. The right wing under Chiang Kai-shek prevailed, and continued radical policies against private merchants and industrialists, even as they denounced communism.

One of the Three Principles of the People of the KMT, Mínshēng, was defined as socialism by Dr. Sun Yat-sen. He defined this principle of saying in his last days "its socialism and its communism". The concept may be understood as social welfare as well. Sun understood it as an industrial economy and equality of land holdings for the Chinese peasant farmers. Here he was influenced by the American thinker Henry George (see Georgism) and German thinker Karl Marx; the land value tax in Taiwan is a legacy thereof. He divided livelihood into four areas: food, clothing, housing, and transportation; and planned out how an ideal (Chinese) government can take care of these for its people.

The KMT was referred to having a socialist ideology. "Equalization of land rights" was a clause included by Dr. Sun in the original Tongmenhui. The KMT's revolutionary ideology in the 1920s incorporated unique Chinese Socialism as part of its ideology.

The Soviet Union trained KMT revolutionaries in the Moscow Sun Yat-sen University. In the West and in the Soviet Union, Chiang was known as the "Red General". Movie theaters in the Soviet Union showed newsreels and clips of Chiang, at Moscow Sun Yat-sen University Portraits of Chiang were hung on the walls, and in the Soviet May Day Parades that year, Chiang's portrait was to be carried along with the portraits of Karl Marx, Lenin, Stalin, and other socialist leaders.

The KMT attempted to levy taxes upon merchants in Canton, and the merchants resisted by raising an army, the Merchant's volunteer corps. Dr. Sun initiated this anti-merchant policy, and Chiang Kai-shek enforced it, Chiang led his army of Whampoa Military Academy graduates to defeat the merchant's army. Chiang was assisted by Soviet advisors, who supplied him with weapons, while the merchants were supplied with weapons from the Western countries.

The KMT was accused of leading a "Red Revolution" in Canton. The merchants were conservative and reactionary, and their Volunteer Corp leader Chen Lianbao was a prominent comprador trader.

The merchants were supported by the Western powers, who led an international flotilla to support them against the KMT. The KMT seized many of Western-supplied weapons from the merchants, using them to equip their troops. A KMT General executed several merchants, and the KMT formed a Soviet-inspired Revolutionary Committee. The British Communist Party sent a letter to Dr. Sun, congratulating him on his military successes.

In 1948, the KMT again attacked the merchants of Shanghai. Chiang Kai-shek sent his son Chiang Ching-kuo to restore economic order. Ching-kuo copied Soviet methods, which he learned during his stay there, to start a social revolution by attacking middle-class merchants. He also enforced low prices on all goods to raise support from the proletariat.

As riots broke out and savings were ruined, bankrupting shop owners, Ching-kuo began to attack the wealthy, seizing assets and placing them under arrest. The son of the gangster Du Yuesheng was arrested by him. Ching-kuo ordered KMT agents to raid the Yangtze Development Corporation's warehouses, which was privately owned by H.H. Kung and his family. H.H. Kung's wife was Soong Ai-ling, the sister of Soong Mei-ling who was Ching-kuo's stepmother. H.H. Kung's son David was arrested, the Kung's responded by blackmailing the Chiang's, threatening to release information about them, eventually he was freed after negotiations, and Ching-kuo resigned, ending the terror on the Shanghainese merchants.

The KMT also promotes government-owned corporations. KMT founder Sun Yat-sen, was heavily influenced by the economic ideas of Henry George, who believed that the rents extracted from natural monopolies or the usage of land belonged to the public. Dr. Sun argued for Georgism and emphasized the importance of a mixed economy, which he termed "The Principle of Minsheng" in his Three Principles of the People.

"The railroads, public utilities, canals, and forests should be nationalized, and all income from the land and mines should be in the hands of the State. With this money in hand, the State can therefore finance the social welfare programs."

The KMT Muslim Governor of Ningxia, Ma Hongkui, promoted state-owned monopolies. His government had a company, Fu Ning Company, which had a monopoly over commerce and industry in Ningxia.

Corporations such as CSBC Corporation, Taiwan, CPC Corporation, Taiwan and Aerospace Industrial Development Corporation are owned by the state in the Republic of China.

Marxists also existed in the KMT. They viewed the Chinese revolution in different terms than the CCP, claiming that China already went past its feudal stage and was in a stagnation period rather than in another mode of production. These Marxists in the KMT opposed the CCP ideology. The Left Kuomintang who disagreed with Chiang Kai-shek formed the [[Revolutionary Committee
of the Chinese Kuomintang]] when the KMT was on the edge of defeat in the civil war and later joined the government of the CCP.

Confucianism and religion in its ideology 

The KMT used traditional Chinese religious ceremonies. According to the KMT, the souls of party martyrs were sent to heaven. Chiang Kai-shek believed that these martyrs still witnessed events on Earth.

The KMT backed the New Life Movement, which promoted Confucianism, and it was also against westernization. KMT leaders also opposed the May Fourth Movement. Chiang Kai-shek, as a nationalist, and Confucianist, was against the iconoclasm of the May Fourth Movement. He viewed some western ideas as foreign, as a Chinese nationalist, and that the introduction of western ideas and literature that the May Fourth Movement wanted was not welcome. He and Sun Yat-sen criticized these May Fourth intellectuals for corrupting morals of youth.

The KMT also incorporated Confucianism in its jurisprudence. It pardoned Shi Jianqiao for murdering Sun Chuanfang, because she did it in revenge since Sun executed her father Shi Congbin, which was an example of filial piety to one's parents in Confucianism. The KMT encouraged filial revenge killings and extended pardons to those who performed them.

In response to the Cultural Revolution, Chiang Kai-shek promoted a Chinese Cultural Renaissance movement which followed in the steps of the New Life Movement, promoting Confucian values.

Education 
The KMT purged China's education system of Western ideas, introducing Confucianism into the curriculum. Education came under the total control of the state, which meant, in effect, the KMT, via the Ministry of Education. Military and political classes on KMT's Three Principles of the People were added. Textbooks, exams, degrees and educational instructors were all controlled by the state, as were all universities.

Soviet-style military 
Chiang Ching-kuo, appointed as KMT director of Secret Police in 1950, was educated in the Soviet Union, and initiated Soviet style military organization in the Republic of China Armed Forces, reorganizing and Sovietizing the political officer corps, surveillance, and KMT activities were propagated throughout the whole of the armed forces. Opposed to this was Sun Li-jen, who was educated at the American Virginia Military Institute. Chiang Ching-kuo then arrested Sun Li-jen, charging him of conspiring with the American CIA of plotting to overthrow Chiang Kai-shek and the KMT, Sun was placed under house arrest in 1955.

Anti-Communism 
Before the founding of the People's Republic of China, the Kuomintang, also known as the Chinese Nationalist Party, led by Chiang Kai-shek, was ruling China and strongly opposed the Chinese Communist Party as it was funded and militarily backed by COMINTERN (Soviet Union) and pursuing a communist revolution to overthrow the Republic of China . On 12 April 1927, Chiang Kai-shek purged the communists in what was known as the Shanghai massacre which led to the Chinese Civil War. The Chinese Nationalist government then led 5 military campaigns in order to wipe out Chinese Soviet Republic, a Soviet-puppet state established by the Chinese Communist Party . Initially, the Kuomintang was successful, eventually forcing the Chinese Communist Party to escape on a long march  until a full-scale invasion of China by Japan forced both the Nationalists and the Communists into an alliance. After the war, the two parties were thrown back into a civil war. The Kuomintang were defeated in the mainland and escaped in exile to Taiwan while the rest of mainland China became Communist in 1949.

Policy on ethnic minorities 

Former KMT leader Chiang Kai-shek considered all the minority peoples of China as descendants of the Yellow Emperor, the semi-mythical initiator of the Chinese civilization. Chiang considered all ethnic minorities in China to belong to the Zhonghua minzu (Chinese nation) and he introduced this into KMT ideology, which was propagated into the educational system of the Republic of China, and the Constitution of the ROC considered Chiang's ideology to be true. In Taiwan, the president performs a ritual honoring the Yellow Emperor, while facing west, in the direction of the Chinese mainland.

The KMT retained the Mongolian and Tibetan Affairs Commission for dealing with Mongolian and Tibetan affairs. A Muslim, Ma Fuxiang, was appointed as its chairman.

The KMT was known for sponsoring Muslim students to study abroad at Muslim universities like Al-Azhar University and it established schools especially for Muslims, Muslim KMT warlords like Ma Fuxiang promoted education for Muslims. KMT Muslim Warlord Ma Bufang built a girls' school for Muslim girls in Linxia City which taught modern secular education.

Tibetans and Mongols refused to allow other ethnic groups like Kazakhs to participate in the Kokonur ceremony in Qinghai, but KMT Muslim General Ma Bufang allowed them to participate.

Chinese Muslims were among the most hardline KMT members. Ma Chengxiang was a Muslim  KMT member, and he refused to surrender to the Communists.

The KMT incited anti-Yan Xishan and Feng Yuxiang sentiments among Chinese Muslims and Mongols, encouraging for them to topple their rule during the Central Plains War.

Masud Sabri, a Uyghur was appointed as Governor of Xinjiang by the KMT, as was the Tatar Burhan Shahidi and the Uyghur Yulbars Khan.

The Muslim General Ma Bufang also put KMT symbols on his mansion, the Ma Bufang Mansion along with a portrait of party founder Dr. Sun Yatsen arranged with the KMT flag and the Republic of China flag.

General Ma Bufang and other high ranking Muslim Generals attended the Kokonuur Lake Ceremony where the God of the Lake was worshipped, and during the ritual, the Chinese national anthem was sung, all participants bowed to a Portrait of KMT founder Dr. Sun Yat-sen, and the God of the Lake was also bowed to, and offerings were given to him by the participants, which included the Muslims. This cult of personality around the KMT leader and the KMT was standard in all meetings. Sun Yat-sen's portrait was bowed to three times by KMT party members. Dr. Sun's portrait was arranged with two flags crossed under, the KMT flag and the flag of the Republic of China.

The KMT also hosted conferences of important Muslims like Bai Chongxi, Ma Fuxiang, and Ma Liang. Ma Bufang stressed "racial harmony" as a goal when he was Governor of Qinghai.

In 1939, Isa Yusuf Alptekin and Ma Fuliang were sent on a mission by the KMT to the Middle Eastern countries such as Egypt, Turkey and Syria to gain support for the Chinese War against Japan, they also visited Afghanistan in 1940 and contacted Muhammad Amin Bughra, they asked him to come to Chongqing, the capital of the Nationalist Government. Bughra was arrested by the British government in 1942 for spying, and the KMT arranged for Bughra's release. He and Isa Yusuf worked as editors of KMT Muslim publications. Ma Tianying (1900–1982) led the 1939 mission which had 5 other people including Isa and Fuliang.

Anti-separatism 
The KMT is anti-separatist. During its rule on mainland China, it crushed Uyghur and Tibetan separatist uprisings. The KMT claims sovereignty over Outer Mongolia and Tuva as well as the territories of the modern People's Republic and Republic of China.

KMT Muslim General Ma Bufang waged war on the invading Tibetans during the Sino-Tibetan War with his Muslim army, and he repeatedly crushed Tibetan revolts during bloody battles in Qinghai provinces. Ma Bufang was fully supported by President Chiang Kai-shek, who ordered him to prepare his Muslim army to invade Tibet several times and threatened aerial bombardment on the Tibetans. With support from the KMT, Ma Bufang repeatedly attacked the Tibetan area of Golog seven times during the KMT Pacification of Qinghai, eliminating thousands of Tibetans.

General Ma Fuxiang, the chairman of the Mongolian and Tibetan Affairs Commission stated that Mongolia and Tibet were an integral part of the Republic of China, arguing:
Our Party [the Guomindang] takes the development of the weak and small and resistance to the strong and violent as our sole and most urgent task. This is even more true for those groups which are not of our kind [Ch. fei wo zulei zhe]. Now the people of Mongolia and Tibet are closely related to us, and we have great affection for one another: our common existence and common honor already have a history of over a thousand years. [...] Mongolia and Tibet's life and death are China's life and death. China absolutely cannot cause Mongolia and Tibet to break away from China's territory, and Mongolia and Tibet cannot reject China to become independent. At this time, there is not a single nation on earth except China that will sincerely develop Mongolia and Tibet.

Under orders from Nationalist Government of Chiang Kai-shek, the Hui General Ma Bufang, Governor of Qinghai (1937–1949), repaired Yushu airport to prevent Tibetan separatists from seeking independence. Ma Bufang also crushed Mongol separatist movements, abducting the Genghis Khan Shrine and attacking Tibetan Buddhist Temples like Labrang, and keeping a tight control over them through the Kokonur God ceremony.

During the Kumul Rebellion, the KMT 36th Division (National Revolutionary Army) crushed a separatist Uyghur First East Turkestan Republic, delivering it a fatal blow at the Battle of Kashgar (1934). The Muslim General Ma Hushan pledged allegiance to the KMT and crushed another Uyghur revolt at Charkhlik Revolt.

During the Ili Rebellion, the KMT fought against Uyghur separatists and the Soviet Union, and against Mongolia.

Ideology in Taiwan

Anti-communism 
On 28 February 1947, the Kuomintang cracked down on an anti-government uprising in Taiwan known as the February 28 incident and the government began the White Terror in Taiwan in order to purge communist spies and prevent Chinese communist subversion. While in Taiwan, the Republic of China government under the Kuomintang remained anti-communist and attempted to recover the mainland from the Communist forces. During the Cold War, Taiwan was referred to as Free China while the China on the mainland was known as Red China or Communist China in the West, to mark the ideological difference between the capitalist 'Free World' and the communist nations. The ROC government under the Kuomintang also actively supported anti-communist efforts in Southeast Asia and around the world. This effort did not cease until the death of Chiang Kai-shek in 1975. The Kuomintang continued to be anti-communist during the period of Chiang Chin-kuo. Contacts between Kuomintang and Chinese Communist Party have started since 1990s to re-establish Cross-Strait relations. Even though anti-communism is written under Kuomintang's party charter, the modern Kuomintang is now seen as PRC-friendly.

Three Principles of the People 

Sun Yat-sen was not just the founder of the Republic of China, but also the founder of the Kuomintang. Sun Yat-sen's political ideology was based on building a free and democratic China founded on Three Principles of the People, namely Democracy (civil rights of people), people's economic livelihood and nationalism. Although the Kuomintang lost control over mainland China in 1949, the Republic of China under Kuomintang rule was able to achieve the political ideal of a democratic Republic of China on the island of Taiwan based on the Three Principles of the People after its retreat to Taiwan. The Three Principles of the People is not just written in the Constitution of the Republic of China, but also in Article 1, 5, 7, 9, 37, 42, 43 of Kuomintang's party charter.

Chinese democracy 
The Kuomintang advocates a free and democratic China under the Republic of China founded on Three Principles of the People. In fact, during the 1980s, Chiang Ching-kuo advocated Grand Alliance for China's Reunification under the Three Principles of the People. Since then, a democracy promotion banner for Grand Alliance for China's Reunification under the Three Principles of the People continues to exist in Kinmen today as a display to mainland China that the Republic of China's unification principle should be based on Chinese democracy. Today, the Kuomintang continues to view the Republic of China as the free, democratic and legitimate China.

Anti-Taiwan independence 
The Kuomintang strongly adheres to the defense of the Republic of China and upholding the Constitution of the Republic of China. It is also strongly opposed to de jure Taiwanese independence (under a theoretical "Republic of Taiwan"), which would mean recognizing the People's Republic of China as the legitimate government representing China.

Chinese conservatism 
The Kuomintang believes in the values associated with Chinese conservatism. The Kuomintang has a strong tradition of defending the established institutions of the Republic of China, such as defending Constitution of the Republic of China, defending the five branches of government (modeled on Sun Yat-sen's political philosophy of Three Principles of the People), espousing the One-China policy as a vital component for the Republic of China (ROC)'s international security and economic development, as opposed to Taiwanization. The Kuomintang claims to have a strong tradition of fighting to defend, preserve and revive traditional Chinese culture and religious freedom as well as advocating for Confucian values, economic liberalism and anti-communism. The KMT still sees the Republic of China on Taiwan as presenting the true cultural China which has preserved Chinese culture, as compared to the People's Republic of China which had experienced Chinese cultural destruction during the Cultural Revolution.

Some Kuomintang conservatives see traditional social or family values as being threatened by liberal values, and oppose same-sex marriage. KMT conservatives are also typically against the abolishment of capital punishment, arguing the need to maintain deterrence against harsh crimes. Conservative KMT policies may also be characterized by a focus on maintaining the traditions and doctrine of Confucian thought, namely reinforcing the morals of paternalism and patriarchy in Taiwan's society. In terms of education policy, KMT policies advocate increasing more Classical Chinese content in Chinese education and Chinese history content in order to reinforce Chinese cultural identity, as opposed to de-sinicization attempts by advocates of Taiwan independence who typically decrease Classical Chinese and Chinese history content in schools in order to achieve Taiwanization.

Parties affiliated with the Kuomintang

Malaysian Chinese Association 

The Malaysian Chinese Association (MCA) was initially pro-ROC and mainly consisted of KMT members who joined as an alternative and were also in opposition to the Malayan Communist Party, supporting the KMT in China by funding them with the intention of reclaiming the Chinese mainland from the communists.

Tibet Improvement Party 

The Tibet Improvement Party was founded by Pandatsang Rapga, a pro-ROC and pro-KMT Khampa revolutionary, who worked against the 14th Dalai Lama's Tibetan Government in Lhasa. Rapga borrowed Sun Yat-sen's Three Principles of the People doctrine and translated his political theories into the Tibetan language, hailing it as the best hope for Asian peoples against imperialism. Rapga stated that "the Sanmin Zhuyi was intended for all peoples under the domination of foreigners, for all those who had been deprived of the rights of man. But it was conceived especially for the Asians. It is for this reason that I translated it. At that time, a lot of new ideas were spreading in Tibet," during an interview in 1975 by Dr. Heather Stoddard. He wanted to destroy the feudal government in Lhasa, in addition to modernizing and secularizing Tibetan society. The ultimate goal of the party was the overthrow of the Dalai Lama's regime, and the creation of a Tibetan Republic which would be an autonomous Republic within the ROC. Chiang Kai-shek and the KMT funded the party and their efforts to build an army to battle the Dalai Lama's government. The KMT was extensively involved in the Kham region, recruiting the Khampa people to both oppose the Dalai Lama's Tibetan government, fight the Communist Red Army, and crush the influence of local Chinese warlords who did not obey the central government.

Vietnamese Nationalist Party 

The KMT assisted the Viet Nam Quoc Dan Dang party which translates literally into Chinese as the Vietnamese Nationalist Party. When it was established, it was based on the Chinese KMT and was pro Chinese. The Chinese KMT helped the party, known as the VNQDD, set up headquarters in Canton and Yunnan, to aid their anti-imperialist struggle against the French occupiers of Indo China and against the Vietnamese Communist Party. It was the first revolutionary nationalist party to be established in Vietnam, before the communist party. The KMT assisted VNQDD with funds and military training.

The VNQDD was founded with KMT aid in 1925, they were against Ho Chi Minh's Viet Nam Revolutionary Youth League. When the VNQDD fled to China after the failed uprising against the French, they settled in Yunnan and Canton, in two different branches. The VNQDD existed as a party in exile in China for 15 years, receiving help, militarily and financially, and organizationally from the Chinese KMT. The two VNQDD parties merged into a single organization, the Canton branch removed the word "revolutionary" from the party name. Lu Han, a KMT official in Nanjing, who was originally from Yunnan, was contacted by the VNQDD, and the KMT Central Executive Committee and Military made direct contact with VNQDD for the first time, the party was reestablished in Nanjing with KMT help.

The Chinese KMT used the VNQDD for its own interests in south China and Indo China. General Zhang Fakui (Chang Fa-kuei), who based himself in Guangxi, established the Viet Nam Cach Menh Dong Minh Hoi meaning "Viet Nam Revolutionary League" in 1942, which was assisted by the VNQDD to serve the KMT's aims. The Chinese Yunnan provincial army, under the KMT, occupied northern Vietnam after the Japanese surrender in 1945, the VNQDD tagging alone, opposing Ho Chi Minh's communist party. The Viet Nam Revolutionary League was a union of various Vietnamese nationalist groups, run by the pro Chinese VNQDD. Its stated goal was for unity with China under the Three Principles of the People, created by KMT founder Dr. Sun and opposition to Japanese and French Imperialists. The Revolutionary League was controlled by Nguyen Hai Than, who was born in China and could not speak Vietnamese. General Zhang shrewdly blocked the Communists of Vietnam, and Ho Chi Minh from entering the league, as his main goal was Chinese influence in Indo China. The KMT utilized these Vietnamese nationalists during World War II against Japanese forces.

A KMT left-winger, General Chang Fa-kuei, worked with Nguyen Hai Than, a VNQDD member, against French Imperialists and Communists in Indo China. General Chang Fa-kuei planned to lead a Chinese army invasion of Tonkin in Indochina to free Vietnam from French control, and to get Chiang Kai-shek's support. The VNQDD opposed the government of Ngo Dinh Diem during the Vietnam War.

The party dissolved after the Fall of Saigon in 1977 and was later re-founded in 1991 as the People's Action Party of Vietnam.

Ryukyu Guomindang 
On 30 November 1958, the establishment of the Ryukyu Guomindang took place. Tsugumasa Kiyuna headed its predecessor party, the Ryukyuan separatist Ryukyu Revolutionary Party which was backed by the Kuomintang in Taiwan.

Hong Kong Pro-ROC camp 
The Pro-ROC camp is a political alignment in Hong Kong. It pledges allegiance to the Republic of China.

One of these members, the 123 Democratic Alliance, dissolved in 2000 due to the lack of financial support from the Taiwan government, after the 2000 Taiwan presidential election.

Sponsored organizations 

Ma Fuxiang founded Islamic organizations sponsored by the KMT, including the China Islamic Association.

KMT Muslim General Bai Chongxi was Chairman of the Chinese Islamic National Salvation Federation. The Muslim Chengda school and Yuehua publication were supported by the Nationalist Government, and they supported the KMT.

The Chinese Muslim Association was also sponsored by the KMT, and it evacuated from the mainland to Taiwan with the party. The Chinese Muslim Association owns the Taipei Grand Mosque which was built with funds from the KMT.

The Yihewani (Ikhwan al Muslimun a.k.a. Muslim brotherhood) was the predominant Muslim sect backed by the KMT. Other Muslim sects, like the Xidaotang were also supported by the KMT. The Chinese Muslim brotherhood became a Chinese nationalist organization and supported KMT rule. Brotherhood Imams like Hu Songshan ordered Muslims to pray for the Nationalist Government, salute KMT flags during prayer, and listen to nationalist sermons.

Election results

Presidential elections

Legislative elections

Local elections

National Assembly elections

See also 

 Sun Yat-sen
 Chiangism
 Chinese nationalism
 Conservatism in Taiwan
 Elections in Taiwan
 Index of Taiwan-related articles
 History of the Kuomintang cultural policy
 History of the Republic of China
 KMT retreat to Taiwan in 1949
 Military of the Republic of China
 National Revolutionary Army
 Nationalist government
 New Kuomintang Alliance
 Pan-Blue Coalition
 Political status of Taiwan
 Politics of the Republic of China
 Revolutionary Committee of the Chinese Kuomintang
 Whampoa Military Academy
 White Terror (Taiwan)

Notes 

 Words in native languages

References

Further reading 

 
 
 John F. Copper. The KMT Returns to Power: Elections in Taiwan, 2008 to 2012 (Lexington Books; 2013) 251 pages. How Taiwan's Nationalist Party regained power after losing in 2000.
 Westad, Odd Arne. Decisive encounters: the Chinese civil war, 1946-1950 (Stanford University Press, 2003). excerpt

External links 

 Kuomintang Official Website 
 Kuomintang News Network 
 The History of Kuomintang (Archived 31 October 2009)
National Policy Foundation Website (Kuomintang Think Tank)

 
1912 establishments in China
Republic of China
History of Taiwan
Three Principles of the People
International Democrat Union member parties
Neoliberal parties
Centre-right parties in Asia
Conservative parties in Asia
Liberal conservative parties
National conservative parties
Nationalist parties in Asia
Organizations based in Taipei
Parties of one-party systems
Political parties established in 1912
Political parties in the Republic of China
Political parties in Taiwan
Politics of the Republic of China (1912–1949)